Iranian Kurdistan or Eastern Kurdistan is an unofficial name for the parts of northwestern Iran with either a majority or sizable population of Kurds. Geographically, it includes the West Azerbaijan Province, Kurdistan Province, Kermanshah Province, Ilam Province and parts of Hamadan Province and Lorestan Province. 

In totality, Kurds are about 10% of Iran's total population. According to the last census conducted in 2006, the four main Kurdish-inhabited provinces in Iran – West Azerbaijan, Kermanshah Province, Kurdistan Province and Ilam Province – had a total population of 6,730,000. Kurds generally consider northwestern Iran (Eastern Kurdistan) to be one of the four parts of a Greater Kurdistan, which under that conception are joined by parts of southeastern Turkey (Northern Kurdistan), northern Syria (Western Kurdistan), and northern Iraq (Southern Kurdistan).

Outside the traditional Kurdistan region, a sizable isolated community of Kurds live in north-eastern Iran, about 1000 km away from Iranian Kurdistan. They are referred to as the Kurds of Khorasan and speak the Kurmanji dialect unlike Kurds in western Iran.

History

Kurdish dynasties
From the 10th century to 12th century A.D., two Kurdish dynasties were ruling this region, the Hasanwayhids (959–1015) and the Ayyarids (990–1117) (in Kermanshah, Dinawar, Ilam and Khanaqin). The Ardalan state, established in the early 14th century, controlled the territories of Zardiawa (Karadagh), Khanaqin, Kirkuk, Kifri, and Hawraman. The capital city of the state was first in Sharazour in present-day Iraqi Kurdistan, but was later moved to Sinne (Sanandaj) (in present-day Iran). The Ardalan Dynasty continued to rule the region until the Qajar monarch Nasser-al-Din Shah (1848–1896) ended their rule in 1867.

Seljukid and Khwarazmid period
In the 12th century CE, Sultan Sanjar created a province called "Kurdistan" centered at Bahar, located to the northeast of Hamadan. This province included Hamadan, Dinawar, Kermanshah, Sanandaj and Sharazur. It was ruled by Sulayman, the nephew of Sanjar. In 1217, Kurds of Zagros defeated the troops of Ala ad-Din Muhammad II, the Khwarazmid king, who were sent from Hamadan.

Safavid period
According to the Encyclopaedia of Islam, the Safavid family came from Iranian Kurdistan, and later moved to Azarbaijan. They finally settled in the 11th century C.E. at Ardabil. During Safavid rule, the government tried to extend its control over Kurdish-inhabited areas in western Iran. At that time, there were a number of semi-independent Kurdish emirates such as the Mukriyan (Mahabad), Ardalan (Sinne), and Shikak tribes around Lake Urmiye and northwest Iran. Kurds resisted this policy and tried to keep some form of self-rule. This led to a series of bloody confrontations between the Safavids and the Kurds. The Kurds were finally defeated, and as a result the Safavids decided to punish rebellious Kurds by forced relocation and deportation in the 15-16th century. This policy began under the reign of the Safavid King Tahmasp I (r. 1514–1576).

Between 1534 and 1535, Tahmasp I began the systematic destruction of the old Kurdish cities and the countryside. Large numbers of Kurds from these areas found themselves deported to the Alborz mountains and Khorasan (Khurasan), as well as the heights in the central Iranian Plateau. At this time the last remnant of the ancient royal Hadhabâni (Adiabene) tribe of central Kurdistan was removed from the heartland of Kurdistan and deported to Khorasan, where they are still found today.

The Safavid era played a substantial role in the integration of Iranian Kurdistan into the political structure of Iran. The Kurdish local elites were strongly aware of their affiliation with Iran, which helped shape Iran's western border.

Battle of DimDim

There is a well documented historical account of a long battle in 1609–1610 between Kurds and the Safavid Empire. The battle took place around a fortress called Dimdim located in Beradost region around Lake Urmia in northwestern Iran. In 1609, the ruined structure was rebuilt by Emîr Xan Lepzêrîn ("Golden Hand Khan"), ruler of Beradost, who sought to maintain the independence of his expanding principality in the face of both Ottoman and Safavid penetration into the region. Rebuilding Dimdim was considered a move toward independence that could threaten Safavid power in the northwest. Many Kurds, including the rulers of Mukriyan (Mahabad), rallied around Amir Khan. After a long and bloody siege led by the Safavid grand vizier Hatem Beg, which lasted from November 1609 to the summer of 1610, Dimdim was captured. All the defenders were massacred. Shah Abbas ordered a general massacre in Beradost and Mukriyan (reported by Eskandar Beg Turkoman, Safavid historian, in the book Alam Aray-e Abbasi) and resettled the Turkish Afshar tribe in the region while deporting many Kurdish tribes to Khorasan. Although Persian historians (like Eskandar Beg) depicted the first battle of Dimdim as a result of Kurdish mutiny or treason, in Kurdish oral traditions (Beytî dimdim), literary works (Dzhalilov, pp. 67–72), and histories, it was treated as a struggle of the Kurdish people against foreign domination. In fact, Beytî dimdim is considered a national epic second only to Mem û Zîn by Ahmad Khani. The first literary account of Dimdim battle was written by Faqi Tayran.

Afshar period
Kurds took advantage of the Afghan invasion of the Safavid realm in the early 18th century, and conquered Hamadan and penetrated to the area near Isfahan. Nader Shah sought to suppress a Kurdish rebellion in 1747, but he was assassinated before completing the expedition. After Nadir's death, Kurdish tribes exploited the power vacuum and captured parts of Fars.

Qajar period
In 1880, Shaykh Ubaydullah, a Kurdish leader, engaged in a series of revolts against the Iranian government. These revolts were successfully suppressed by the Qajar kings, and this was one of Iran's few victories during the Qajar period. In the early 20th century, Ismail Agha Simko took advantage of the chaotic situation in the aftermath of World War I and rebelled against the Iranian government. He was finally defeated by Reza Shah Pahlavi.

Kurds in modern Iran

Simko revolts against Reza Shah

The weakness of the Persian government during World War I encouraged some Kurdish chiefs to take advantage of the chaotic situation. Simko, chief of the Shikak tribe, established his authority in the area west of Lake Urmia from 1918 to 1922. Jaafar Sultan of Hewraman region took control of the region between Marivan and north of Halabja and remained independent until 1925. In 1922, Reza Khan (who later became the first Pahlavi monarch), took action against Kurdish leaders. Simko was forced to abandon his region in the fall of 1922, and spent eight years in hiding. When the Iranian government persuaded him to submit, he was ambushed and killed around Ushno (Oshnavieh) in 1930. After this, Reza Shah pursued a crude but effective policy against the Kurds. Hundreds of Kurdish chiefs were deported and forced into exile. Their lands were also confiscated by the government.

World War II
When Allied troops entered Iran in September 1941, the Persian Army was quickly dissolved and their ammunition was seized by the Kurds. Sons of the Kurdish chiefs seized the opportunity and escaped from their exile in Tehran. Hama Rashid, a Kurdish chief from Baneh, took control of Sardasht, Baneh and Mariwan in western Iran. He was finally driven out of the region by the Persian Army in the fall of 1944.

Republic of Kurdistan in Mahabad

Although Iran had declared its neutrality in the Second World War, it was occupied by Allied forces. With support from the Soviet Union, a Kurdish state was created in the city of Mahabad in 1946 by the Kurdish Movement Komeley Jiyanewey Kurd under the leadership of Qazi Muhammad. Since the minuscule entity extended no further than the small cities of Mahabad, Bukan, Piranshahr, and Oshnaviyeh in Iran, not even all of Iranian Kurdistan supported the experiment, let alone the Kurds in other states. The Republic of Mahabad, as it is often called, lasted less than a year, as the end of the war and the withdrawal of the occupying Soviet forces allowed the central government to defeat the separatists and return Kurdistan to Iran.

Islamic Revolution and the Kurds

Kurdish political organizations were enthusiastic supporters of the revolution against the Shah, which brought Ayatollah Khomeini to power in February 1979. The Shah had shown himself to be no friend of Kurdish aspirations for greater autonomy and a loosening of Tehran's control over their affairs.

The Kurds, with their different language and traditions and their cross-border alliances, were seen as vulnerable to exploitation by foreign powers who wished to destabilize the young republic.

The crisis deepened after Kurds were denied seats in the "Assembly of Experts" gathering in 1979, which were responsible for writing the new constitution. Ayatollah Khomeini prevented Dr. Ghassemlou, the elected representative of the region, from participating in the assembly of experts' first meeting.

The wave of nationalism engulfed eastern Kurdistan after the fall of the Pahlavi dynasty in line with a series of anti-revolutionary revolts across the country. In early 1979 armed conflict broke out between armed Kurdish factions and the Iranian revolutionary government's security forces. The Kurdish forces included primarily the Democratic Party of Iranian Kurdistan (KDPI) and the leftist Komalah (Revolutionary Organization of Kurdish Toilers).

In a speech in December 1979, Ayatollah Khomeini called the concept of ethnic minorities contrary to Islamic doctrines. He also accused those "who do not wish Muslim countries to be united" in creating the issue of nationalism among minorities. His views were shared by many in the clerical leadership.

Kurdish movement between Shia Kurds in southern Iranian Kurdistan
David McDowall has argued that since the 1990s Kurdish nationalism has seeped into the Shia Kurdish area partly due to outrage against government's violent suppression of Kurds farther north, but David Romano reject such claims noting that there's no evidence of an active guerrilla insurgency in the area. Although, there is a new rise of Kurdish identity movement in the southern parts of Iranian Kurdistan, which has risen up from the first decade of 21st century that shows itself in the way of formation of an armed group called the Partisans of Southern Kurdistan and some other organizations specially about Yarsani people of that parts of Kurdistan.

1996 demonstrations
On December 2, 1996, the death of a prominent Sunni clergyman, Mulla Mohammed Rabiei, in Kermanshah led to violent clashes between Sunni Kurds and the security forces. Mulla Rabiei was the prayer leader in the Al-Shafe'i mosque in Kermanshah. The protests continued for three days and spread to neighboring towns in the region.

Khatami period

In 1997, Sunni Kurds like many other Iranians took part in the presidential election. Both civilian and military Kurdish opposition groups requested Kurds "not to be indifferent" toward the election. President Khatami praised the glory of Kurdish culture and history. From the Kurdish side, the demands were mainly related to the Kurdish language and top-level officials. In his first term, Khatami appointed Abdollah Ramezanzadeh to be the first Kurdish governor of the Iranian province of Kurdistan. He also appointed several Sunni and Shia Kurds as his own or cabinet members' advisors. In his second term, Khatami had two Kurdish cabinet members; both of them were Shia. The increased presence of Kurdish representatives in the sixth parliament led to expectations that some of the voters' demands would be met. After the first round, in which 18 Kurds were elected, one candidate said that he expected there would be more Kurdish instruction at the university in Sanandaj, and he called on the Khatami government to have more Kurdish officials. Subsequently, a 40-member parliamentary faction representing the predominantly Kurdish provinces of Kurdistan and Kermanshah was formed.  However, there were many other civilian Kurdish activists who did not join the reform movement. Mohammad Sadiq Kaboudvand was among the latter who started an independent human rights association to defend the rights of the Kurdish people.

1999 demonstrations
In February 1999, Kurdish nationalists took to the streets in several cities such as Mahabad, Sanandaj and Urmia and staged mass protests against the government and in support of Abdullah Öcalan. This was viewed as "trans-nationalization" of the Kurdish movement. These protests were violently suppressed by the government forces. According to human rights groups, at least 20 people were killed.

Discrimination against Sunni Muslims
Despite the fact that more than one million Sunnis live in Tehran, many of them Kurds, no Sunni mosque exists to serve their religious needs.

The Shivan Qaderi incident
On July 9, 2005, a Kurdish opposition activist, Shivan Qaderi (also known as Shwane Qadri or Sayed Kamal Asfaram), and two other Kurdish men were shot by Iranian security forces in Mahabad.

For the next six weeks, riots and protests erupted in Kurdish towns and villages throughout Eastern Kurdistan such as Mahabad, Piranshahr. Sinne (Sanandaj), Sardasht, Oshnavieh (Şino), Baneh, Bokan and Saqiz (and even inspiring protests in southwestern Iran and in Baluchistan in eastern Iran) with scores killed and injured, and an untold number arrested without charge.

On 13 March 2006, Saleh Nikbakht, a well-known Iranian human rights lawyer who is Mr. Qaderi's lawyer, announced that Qaderi's murderer was a member of the police who shot the victim illegally. He also added that the murderer and the one who ordered the act are under investigation and the judiciary system has been cooperative up to now.

Political prisoners and executions
Kurds have suffered a long history of discrimination in Iran. In a report released in 2008, Amnesty International said that Kurds have been a particular target of the Islamic Republic of Iran, and the Kurds' "social, political and cultural rights have been repressed, as have their economic aspirations." As a result, many human rights activists in Iran often shift their focus to specifically identify the Iranian authorities' violations of human rights against the Kurdish minority. However, according to Amnesty International, those activists who do "link their human rights work – drawing attention to the government's failure to observe international human rights standards - to their Kurdish identity they risk further violations of their rights."

At the beginning of the 21st century, a number of Kurdish activists, writers, and teachers have been arrested for their work and were sentenced to death. The increase is likely due to the government's crackdown following the nationwide protests after Iran's presidential elections. Even before the elections, Kurdish rebel groups - specifically the Party for a Free Life in Kurdistan or PJAK - have taken up arms against the state.

In November 2009, Iran executed Ehsan Fattahian - the first of over a dozen political prisoners on death row - despite an international campaign calling for his release. Authorities accused Fattahian of carrying arms for an "illegal organization" and sentenced him to several years in prison. Fattahian never confessed to carrying arms and was not given a fair trial, nor was he permitted access to his lawyer, and the Komala - the illegal organization he was accused of associating with - claimed that he had left the group a long time ago. Fattahian attempted to appeal, and when he did so, he was sentenced to death for "enmity against God". His execution was condemned by human rights groups and activists internationally.

In January 2010, Iran executed a second Kurdish political prisoner, Fasih Yasamani, for "enmity against God". Like Fattahian, Yasamani was tortured and authorities tried to force him to confess, but he refused. He was also denied a fair trial.

Without notifying the families or lawyers of the political prisoners, Iranian authorities ordered the execution of four more Kurdish political prisoners - Ali Heydarian, Farhad Vakili, Mehdi Eslamian, Shirin Alam Hooli, and Farzad Kamangar, a teacher who received a lot of attention internationally following his arrest - in Iran on May 9, 2010. The four political prisoners suffered severe torture at the hands of Iranian authorities and were also forced to confess their memberships in an illegal organization - namely PJAK. None of the activists were given fair trials nor did they have access to their lawyers. Amnesty International described the executions as "a blatant attempt to intimidate members of the Kurdish minority."

Despite repeated international calls demanding the release or retrial of these four political prisoners, all were executed without any prior notice or warning. Following the executions, Iranian authorities refused to return the bodies of those executed to their families.

As of May 2010, there were at least 16 other Kurdish political prisoners on death row. Not one case has been reported as having received a fair trial.

Kurdish militant group operating inside Iran 
The Kurdistan Free Life Party or PJAK. Feb 4, 2009, Stuart Levey, U.S. Treasury undersecretary for terrorism and financial intelligence stated "With today's action, we are exposing PJAK's (Free Life Party of Kurdistan) terrorist ties to the PKK and supporting Turkey's efforts to protect its citizens from attack."

See also
 Kurds in Iran
 Gawirkayeti
 Kurdistan
 Kurdistan Province

Notes

References

Sources

External links
 Ethnic groups and the state: Azaris, Kurds and Baluch of Iran, by R. Farzanfar, PhD Dissertation, Massachusetts Institute of Technology, Dept. of Political Science, 1992
 PJAK Intensifies Its Struggle for Iranian Kurdistan by Chris Zambelis
 Human Rights Watch report on ethnic minorities
 Status of the Kurds in Iranian Kurdistan
 The tragedy of being Kurd in Iran, by Ali Reza Nourizadeh
 Photography of Kurdistan
 Kurdistanica, Encyclopedia of Kurdistan
 Kurdish Academy of Language (KAL)

 
Regions of Iran
Iranian
Kurdistan, Iranian